Peter Alexander,  (19 September 1893 – 18 June 1969) was a Scottish literary scholar. He was Regius Professor of English Language and Literature at the University of Glasgow and a noted Shakespearean scholar. His collected works of Shakespeare are known as "the Alexander text". In 1914, he joined the army as a private in the Cameron Highlanders but left in 1918 after he became an artillery officer. Alexander returned to the University of Glasgow to finish his studies and graduated in 1920 with an MA degree.

Selected publications
Shakespeare (Home University Library of Modern Knowledge)
Shakespeare's Life and Art, 1939.
Hamlet: Father and Son, 1955.
The Complete Works of Shakespeare: The Alexander Text

References 

Shakespearean scholars
1893 births
1969 deaths
Academics of the University of Glasgow
Fellows of the British Academy
Commanders of the Order of the British Empire
Queen's Own Cameron Highlanders soldiers
British Army personnel of World War I
Royal Field Artillery officers